Karl-Erik "Calle" Palmér (17 April 1929 – 2 February 2015) was a Swedish professional football player who played as a midfielder. He represented Malmö FF, Legnano, and Juventus during a club career that spanned between 1948 and 1960. A full international between 1949 and 1952, he won 14 caps and scored ten goals for the Sweden national team. He scored three goals in five games as Sweden finished third at the 1950 FIFA World Cup.

Personal life 
Palmér was the father of former professional footballer Anders Palmér who also represented the Sweden national team and won the Swedish Championship with Malmö FF.

Career statistics

International 

 Scores and results list Sweden's goal tally first, score column indicates score after each Palmér goal.

Honours
Malmö FF

 Allsvenskan: 1948–49, 1949–50, 1950–51

Juventus
Coppa Italia: 1958–59
Sweden

 FIFA World Cup third place: 1950
Individual

 Stor Grabb: 1950

References

External links
Career summary by playerhistory.com 

Picture of his career, Sydsvenskan

1929 births
2015 deaths
Swedish footballers
Sweden international footballers
Swedish expatriate footballers
Expatriate footballers in Italy
Allsvenskan players
Serie A players
Malmö FF players
A.C. Legnano players
Juventus F.C. players
1950 FIFA World Cup players
Association football midfielders
Footballers from Malmö